Thomas Anderson Swinburne (9 August 1915 –  19 December 1969) was an English professional football goalkeeper who played in the Football League for Newcastle United. Swinburne represented England once, in a Wartime International in December 1939. 

Swinburne was initially offered terms by West Ham United having been scouted playing for Herrington Swifts at the age of 17, however as he was home sick he returned to the North East. He was quickly signed by Newcastle and made his debut for them on 12 September 1934 against Blackpool.

His career was greatly disturbed by World War 2, with Swinburne serving as a PT and fitness instructor for the RAF in Egypt.

After the war, he restarted his Newcastle career, and was a star performer during their 1946/1947 FA cup run, which saw Newcastle finish as semi-finalists. His final appearance for the Magpies was against Newport County on 7 June 1947. 

The character of Jill Swinburne in the Biederbecke Trilogy was named in homage to the Newcastle goalkeeper.

Personal life 
Swinburne's sons Alan and Trevor also became professional footballers.

Honours

Career statistics

References 

English footballers
English Football League players
Association football goalkeepers
1915 births
1969 deaths
People from Houghton-le-Spring
Footballers from Tyne and Wear
Hull City A.F.C. players
Newcastle United F.C. players
Consett A.F.C. players
Darlington Town F.C. players
Royal Air Force personnel of World War II
Royal Air Force Physical Training instructors